Deylamabad (also Romanized as Deylamābād; also known as Dalamdeh, Dalmā Deh, and Deylamdeh) is a village in Shahrud Rural District, Shahrud District, Khalkhal County, Ardabil Province, Iran. At the 2006 census, its population was 218, in 51 families.

References 

Towns and villages in Khalkhal County